Priscilla Napier (5 October 1908 – 10 October 1998) was an English writer, specializing in biography.

Early life and education
Born in Oxford in 1908, Priscilla Hayter was the daughter of Sir William Hayter, an adviser to the Egyptian government, and his wife, Alethea Slessor, daughter of a Hampshire rector. Her brother, Sir William Goodenough Hayter (1906–1995), became British ambassador to the Soviet Union and Warden of New College, Oxford, while her sister Alethea Hayter (1911–2006) was a literary biographer. She spent her early years in Cairo, and later wrote of her mother and her aunts that they were "true Victorians: not in a general way frightened of murder and sudden death, but perfectly terrified of insects". 

Napier was educated at Downe House School, in Berkshire, which was then under the headship of its founder Olive Willis, and at Lady Margaret Hall, Oxford, where she graduated (like her sister Alethea three years later) BA in modern history.

Career 
At the age of twenty-two, Priscilla Hayter married Trevylyan Michael Napier born 21 June 1901 Kensington London, a Royal Navy officer and a scion of the Napier family of Merchiston. A Napier ancestor had arrived in Somerset from Scotland in the reign of Henry VII, and Trevylyan Napier's father, like his grandfather, was a vice-admiral. After her husband was killed on active service in 1940, Priscilla Napier was left to bring up their son and two daughters. She then developed a writing career based on studies of her dead husband's family. She also published poetry and an autobiography.

Publications
A Late Beginner (autobiography, 1966)
The Sword Dance: Lady Sarah Lennox and the Napiers (1971)
A Difficult Country: the Napiers in Scotland (1972)
Revolution and the Napier Brothers, 1820-1840 (1973)
I Have Sind: Charles Napier in India, 1841-1844 (Michael Russell Publishing, 1990)
Raven Castle: Charles Napier in India, 1844-1851 (1991)
Bishop Theophan's The Art of Prayer (translation)
A Memoir of the Lady Delia Peel, Born Spencer, 1889-1981 (1984)
Ballad of King Henry VIII and Sir Thomas Wyatt (1994, long poem, with foreword by Ted Hughes)
Black Charlie, a life of Admiral Sir Charles Napier (1995)
Barbarian Eye: Lord Napier in China, 1834 (1995)
Henry at Sea (1997)
Henry Ashore (1997)

References

1908 births
1998 deaths
Alumni of Lady Margaret Hall, Oxford
People educated at Downe House School
English autobiographers
English biographers
Writers from Oxford